Jean Satterthwaite Faust was born Jean Satterthwaite in Tarboro, NC, March 19, 1930. She currently resides in New York City.
Education: Weldon High School, Weldon, NC, Graduated 1948, Double major in English and Drama at University of North Carolina at Greensboro 1952, minor in Education

Family
Jean married author Irvin Faust on August 29, 1959.

Career
Jean taught English and Drama 1952 - 1953 in North Carolina, moved to New York 1953; Administrative Assistant at Elizabeth Arden from 1953–1962, Supervisor of Mail Order Dept., Buyer, Designer of small leather goods, Mark Cross.
Administrative Aide to Congressman William F. Ryan, NY, 1965–1970

Organizations
(National Organization for Women) Activities: 
 1966-67 First President of the first chapter of National Organization for Women; NOW - New York
 Vice President NOW
 Chair of the Committee on the EEOC
 12/1968 - 03/1970: National NOW legislative Co-Chair
 1968-69 National NOW, Board of Directors

References

External links
Jean Faust Papers. Schlesinger Library, Radcliffe Institute, Harvard University.
 http://www.now.org/

1930 births
Living people
American women's rights activists